The Cheat (French: Forfaiture) is a 1937 French drama film directed by Marcel L'Herbier and starring Victor Francen, Sessue Hayakawa and Louis Jouvet. It is a remake of the American silent film The Cheat by Cecil B. DeMille.

The film's sets were designed by the art director Robert Gys. It was shot at the Billancourt Studios in Paris.

Main cast
 Victor Francen as Pierre Moret 
 Sessue Hayakawa as Prince Hu-Long 
 Louis Jouvet as Valfar 
 Lise Delamare as Denise Moret 
 Lucas Gridoux as Tang-Si 
 Ève Francis as Mrs. Curtis 
 Lucien Nat as Maître Ribeyre 
 Pierre Magnier as Le Président de la société 
 Jean Brochard as Félicien 
 Sylvia Bataille as Ming

References

Bibliography 
 Kennedy-Karpat, Colleen. Rogues, Romance, and Exoticism in French Cinema of the 1930s. Fairleigh Dickinson, 2013.

External links 
 

1937 films
French drama films
1937 drama films
1930s French-language films
Films directed by Marcel L'Herbier
Films scored by Michel Michelet
Films shot at Billancourt Studios
French remakes of American films
Sound film remakes of silent films
French black-and-white films
1930s French films

fr:Forfaiture (film, 1937)